Mark Billson (born 1 March 1961) is a South African cricketer. He played in 27 first-class and 6 List A matches for Eastern Province from 1982/83 to 1989/90.

See also
 List of Eastern Province representative cricketers

References

External links
 

1961 births
Living people
South African cricketers
Eastern Province cricketers
Cricketers from Port Elizabeth